The Avenue Franklin Roosevelt (French) or Franklin Rooseveltlaan (Dutch) is an avenue in Brussels, Belgium. It is located in the southern part of the City of Brussels, near the border with the municipality of Ixelles, where it runs parallel to the Bois de la Cambre/Ter Kamerenbos. It is named in honour of the 32nd President of the United States, Franklin Delano Roosevelt (1882–1945).

The Avenue Franklin Roosevelt is known as one of the most beautiful avenues in Brussels. Many of the houses on the avenue date from the 1920s to the Second World War. It also houses many embassies and residences of ambassadors.

History
The avenue was laid out in 1922, according to the wishes of King Leopold II, through the site of the Brussels International Exposition of 1910. The construction of the avenue, the adjacent arteries and the first buildings mostly took place during the interwar period. Before 1945, it was called the / ("Nations Avenue"). Its name was then changed to the / in honour of the 32nd President of the United States, Franklin Delano Roosevelt.

In spite of Brussels' city planning free-for-all between the end of the Second World War and the late 1960s, the appearance of the Avenue Franklin Roosevelt has mostly remained unchanged over time; the vast majority of its buildings is indeed very well preserved, and some of them are now classified as historic monuments.

Notable buildings
The Avenue Franklin Roosevelt is home to many buildings in Art Nouveau, Art Deco, modernist and eclectic styles. The Solbosch campus of the Université libre de Bruxelles (ULB), a French-speaking university, with about 20,000 students, is also situated on the Avenue Franklin Roosevelt.

 No. 65: Villa Bernheim, which was occupied by Émile Bernheim, former President of the group À l'Innovation and is now an art gallery.
 No. 110: Art Deco apartment building (1931) by Antoine Varlet

Embassies and consulates
The Avenue Franklin Roosevelt houses many embassies, including from the City of Brussels towards Watermael-Boitsfort:

 Morocco 
 Republic of the Congo
 Kuwait
 Niger
 Moldova
 Mexico
 Colombia
 Jordan
 Canada
 Qatar
 Singapore
 Uzbekistan
 Lebanon
 Djibouti
 Iran
 Iraq
 Kurdistan
 Ivory Coast
 Oman
 Brunei

See also

 List of streets in Brussels
 Art Nouveau in Brussels
 Art Deco in Brussels
 History of Brussels
 Belgium in "the long nineteenth century"

References

Notes

Streets in Brussels
Ixelles
1922 establishments in Belgium